Meszno  (German Mösen) is a village in the administrative district of Gmina Otmuchów, within Nysa County, Opole Voivodeship, in south-western Poland, close to the Czech border.

The village has an approximate population of 380.

References

Meszno